The 1952 Nobel Prize in Literature was awarded to the French Catholic writer François Mauriac (1885–1970) "for the deep spiritual insight and the artistic intensity with which he has in his novels penetrated the drama of human life." He is the eight French author to receive the prize after the novelist André Gide in 1947.

Laureate

François Mauriac made his breakthrough with the poetry book Les Mains jointes ("Clasped Hands", 1909), but went on to become as a dramatist and novelist. His works are frequently set in and around Bordeaux, France, and investigate human nature through the lens of Catholicism. The characters struggle with money, self-righteousness, and guilt. As a result, Mauriac has been portrayed as a misanthrope at times, but he replied to this criticism by stating that the repeated messages in his writings about divine mercy and compassion were designed to inspire hope and confidence. His most well-known works include La Chair et le Sang ("Flesh and Blood", 1920), Le Désert de l'amour ("The Desert of Love", 1925), Thérèse Desqueyroux (1927), Le Nœud de vipères ("Vipers' Tangle", 1932).

Deliberations

Nominations
In total, the Swedish Academy's Nobel Committee received 57 nominations for 40 individuals. Fourteen of the nominees were newly nominated such as Paul Vialar, Juan Ramón Jiménez (awarded in 1956), Walter de la Mare, Julien Benda, Salvador de Madariaga, Albert Schweitzer (awarded the 1952 Nobel Peace Prize), Werner Bergengruen, and Van Wyck Brooks. Only one female author was nominate: Spanish author Concha Espina de la Serna.

The authors August Alle, Mariano Azuela, Ioan Alecu Bassarabescu, Margaret Wise Brown, Paul Bujor, Romain Coolus, Annie Sophie Cory, Norman Douglas, Paul Éluard, Jeffery Farnol, Gilbert Frankau, Cicely Hamilton, Aaro Hellaakoski, Masao Kume, Nadezhda Alexandrovna Lokhvitskaya (known as Teffi), Harold John Massingham, Charles Maurras, Ferenc Molnár, Maria Montessori, Pedro Prado, Josephine Tey, Lodewijk van Deyssel, Louis Verneuil, Clara Viebig, and Roger Vitrac died in 1952 without having been nominated for the prize. The Belgian writer Charles Plisnier died months before the announcement.

References

External links
Award Ceremony speech nobelprize.org

1952